Maryland's 3rd congressional district comprises all of Howard county as well as parts of Anne Arundel and Carroll counties. The seat is currently represented by John Sarbanes, a Democrat.

Three people who represented Maryland in the United States Senate were also former representatives of the 3rd district, including Ben Cardin, Barbara Mikulski, and Paul Sarbanes.

The district's previously odd shape was attributed to gerrymandering to favor Democratic candidates, following the 2000 and 2010 censuses. In 2012, the district was found to be the third least compact congressional district in the United States, and in 2014, The Washington Post called it the nation's second-most gerrymandered district. John Sarbanes, the current Democratic Representative for the district, put forth the For the People Act of 2019 to address electoral reform, voting rights, and gerrymandering in the United States. Following the 2020 redistricting cycle, it now comprises Howard County, most of Anne Arundel County including Glen Burnie and Annapolis, and part of Carroll County, specifically the areas around Mount Airy.

Recent elections in statewide races

Recent elections

2000s

2010s

2020s

Historical boundaries and composition

Maryland's 3rd district was one of the 61 districts that elected a representative to the 1st United States Congress. It also has the distinction of being one of the few congressional districts that once included areas not currently in the state they are in. The 3rd congressional district originally was composed of Prince George's County, Maryland and Anne Arundel County, Maryland. At that point, what is now Howard County, Maryland, was in Anne Arundel County, and Prince George's County included the eastern half of the District of Columbia.

In 1792, the Maryland 3rd Congressional District was moved to include Montgomery County, Maryland, and the eastern half of Frederick County, Maryland.  The population was about 33,000.  However, the western portion of what is today Carroll County, Maryland was at this point in Frederick County, and the western half of the District of Columbia was in Montgomery County. This latter fact explains why the district lost population, even though it, in theory, did not experience redistricting after the 1800 census. With the population of Georgetown, D. C., no longer in the district, its 1800 population was about 31,000. At this point, the 3rd was Maryland's least populous district, barely having half the population of the Baltimore City and County 5th district, which, in 1800, had just above 59,000 inhabitants.

The boundaries remained the same after the 1810, 1820, and 1830 censuses. While, in 1820, the district had about 36,000 inhabitants, its population had risen to 53,622 in 1830. With the formation of Carroll County in the 1830s, as well as Maryland falling from 8 to 6 congressional seats, the boundaries of the 3rd Congressional District were drastically redrawn. The only area that remained in the 3rd Congressional District was the part of Carroll County that had been in Frederick County. The 3rd also included Baltimore County and the western half of the city of Baltimore. Its new population was 69,923, 24.5% of whom were black.

In 1853, the 3rd district was redrawn again. The new district consisted of Baltimore County, except for the northern and western parts of the county and about the eastern third of the City of Baltimore. The district now had a population of 95,729. In the redistricting following the 1860 census, Maryland was reduced to five congressional districts. The 3rd was moved so that it contained the part of Baltimore that had not been in the 3rd before 1863. It now had a population of 130,040. In 1873, the 3rd district was moved again, to be the east side of Baltimore. It now had a population of 120,978.

List of members representing the district

See also

 Maryland's congressional districts
 Gerrymandering
 List of United States congressional districts

Notes

References

03
1789 establishments in Maryland
Constituencies established in 1789